Ventura Tenario (25 November 1911 – 13 November 1984), better known by his ring name Chief Little Wolf (sometimes, Big Chief Little Wolf),  was an American professional wrestler, who spent much of his professional career wrestling in Australia and New Zealand.

Family
The second of four children of Jose Porfiria "Joe" Tenario (1884-1956), and Maria Soleila "Mary" Tenario (1890-1928), née Senas, Ventura Tenario was born at Hoehne, Colorado on 25 November 1911.

He married three times. His first wife was Irene Olive (1909-1998); his second wife was Dorothy Helen Pratt (1918-1972), whom he married in 1946; and his third wife was Australian-born Audrey Lillis "Dona" Corner (1923-2013) — with whom he had a daughter, Markeeta.

Markeeta Little Wolf
Markeeta, born in Christchurch, New Zealand, on 25 January 1958, was a pop-star in Australia by the time that she was 16. She later moved to the USA; and, having unsuccessfully tried to break into the American music industry and the Hollywood movie scene, she turned to real-estate, eventually moving to Waitsburg, Washington, where she married lawyer Michael Hubbard, became involved in local politics, joined the City Council, and served three terms as the city's Mayor.

Ernesto Tenario
According to the Online World of Wrestling, Ventura's brother, Ernesto Tenario (1915-1998), wrestled under the name of "Chief Lone Wolf".

Military service
He enlisted in the United States Army in May 1943 and served until January 1945. He served in the European Theater of Operations in World War II.

Wrestling
In his professional career, which lasted from 1932 to 1958, he fought in 1,141 matches for 501 wins, 178 draws, and 357 defeats; his opponents included: Lord James Blears, Warren Bockwinkel, Paul Boesch, Orville Brown, Jack Claybourne, Man Mountain Dean, Dean Detton, Yukon Eric, Ken Fenelon, Gorgeous George, Otto Kuss, Dave Levin, Ed Lewis, Jim Londos, Wild Bill Longson, Bobby Managoff, Mike Mazurki, Bronko Nagurski, Danno O'Mahoney, Harold Sakata, "Jumping Joe" Savoldi, Frank Sexton, Kinji Shibuya, Gus Sonnenberg, Sándor Szabó, Lou Thesz, and George Zaharias.

In 1946, having resumed his wrestling career post-war, and before returning to Australia, he sustained a double fracture of a leg in a match in Chicago; and, for a time, it was thought that he would not wrestle again.

United States
In February 1935, the (then) reigning heavyweight champion, Jim Londos was suspended in California, Illinois, and New York for failing to appear for his scheduled World Heavyweight Championship (Pacific Northwest) title defense against Tenario on 27 February 1935.

On 8 July 1935, Chief Little Wolf wrestled against Daniel "Danno" O'Mahoney, at Yankee Stadium, New York, in a heavyweight title match. This was the first title defence for O'Mahoney, who had won the New York State Athletic Commission World Heavyweight Championship from Jim Londos twelve days earlier, on 27 June 1935. O'Mahoney eventually won the match, by a pinfall, after 28 minutes and 23 seconds.

Australia and New Zealand
Tenario arrived in Auckland, New Zealand, from Vancouver, Canada, on 28 June 1937. In his first match in New Zealand, he was defeated (on points) by Sammy Stein; and, in his last match on his first visit to New Zealand, against Earl McCready on 9 August 1937, he was disqualified in the seventh round.

At the time of his first Australian appearance, on 28 August 1937, in a match against Hal Rumberg, at West Melbourne, the press noted that "Chief Little Wolf is at present ranked third on the list of world heavy weights".

In 1947, the wrestling journalist, "Ringmaster", noted that "his capacity for absorbing punishment seems to be unlimited, and he has the power and stamina to keep handing it out indefinitely". In Australia, from 1937 to 1958, "he fought more than a hundred individual wrestlers in more than a thousand contests"; and, in addition to his stadium wrestling he had a travelling tent-show, in which he demonstrated professional wrestling holds, told Navajo stories, and performed horse-riding tricks, with which he toured most of Australia — claiming, in 1953, that seventy-five percent of the Australian people had physically seen him either as a wrestler or as a tent-show performer.

In his last match in Australia, he teamed with "Great Zorro" in a tag-team match, at West Melbourne Stadium on 10 November 1956. They defeated the team of "Lucky" Simunovich and Dr. Jerry Graham, two falls to one.

Retirement
He wrestled twice more in the USA:
 26 February 1957 (Syracuse, New York): teamed with Bob Leipler (a.k.a. "Duke Hoffmann"), he lost a tag-team match against "Mr. Hito" and "Mr. Moto" in 24 minutes 17 seconds. 
 5 March 1957 (Syracuse, New York): he was defeated by Dick Beyer in 15 mins 7 seconds.

Tenario suffered a debilitating stroke "that badly affected one side of his body and face" in 1958. He retired from wrestling, and never worked again. He lived at Mount Royal Special Hospital for the Aged, in Parkville, Victoria, from 1961 to 1980, when he returned to the United States.

Australian Folk-Hero
In his 1998 article, "Big Chief Little Wolf: Wrestling, Radio and Folklore in Australia", Barry York — at the time a Research Fellow at the Australian National University — describes how, in the months following his (1994) appeal for information from the public on Bert Newton's Good Morning Australia, he received more than 700 letters from "former wrestlers who had wrestled him, … nurses who had nursed him … and hundreds of people who had seen him wrestle or caught his side-show, or who had just met him by chance in the street or in a restaurant, pub, shop or cinema".
     Their letters represent a folkloric understanding of the Chief. They indicate the qualities that individual writers wanted to believe were his qualities. Even the most exaggerated letter is a valuable source in identifying why so many people cherish him without even necessarily really knowing him personally.     If I were to sum up from the entire collection of 700 letters, I would say that Chief Little Wolf is a folk-hero because of the following perceived qualities …: he came from underprivileged origins and, despite success and celebrity status, identified with the common folk; he was an exceptionally kind-hearted human being: active and generous in helping others less fortunate than himself; he was excellent at what he did; he was regarded as possessing super-human qualities; he suffered a quick and tragic decline; and he was exotic — an acceptable outsider, a foreigner of the non-threatening kind.

Captain Tom Bairnsfather
During the sixth round of a fierce best-of-three-falls match against Terry McGinnis, at Leichhardt Stadium, on Saturday, 7 September 1940, with each wrestler having scored a fall, Tenario was thrown from the ring by McGinnis. McGinnis, who had lost his temper, refused to allow Tenario to re-enter the ring, and went on to attack the referee; and, for this, he was disqualified.

On 24 October 1940, Thomas Duncan Bairnsfather  (1897-1949) — brother of Bruce Bairnsfather, Leichhardt Stadium's ring announcer, and, as "Captain Tom Bairnsfather", the ring-side wrestling commentator for the Sydney radio station 2KY (2KY listeners were assisted by the I.A.W. chart) — lodged a Supreme Court writ for £2,000 against Tenario, McGinnis, and New Leichhardt Stadium, Ltd., alleging that, "on September 9 last, when Chief Little Wolf and McGinnis were wrestling at Leichhardt Stadium, McGinnis threw Little Wolf out of the ring on top of Bairnsfather, causing him considerable Injury".

Responding to a ca re, Tenario's own position was that "I am under contract and I am fully protected against any accident that might occur". Tenario was released on a £350 bond. Tenario was released from bail on 21 November 1940, and was eventually allowed to leave Australia. Although Tenario returned to Australia, as promised, in July 1941, nothing more was heard of Bairnsfather's legal actions — although, of course, Bairnsfather was no stranger to being a defendant at court.

Championships and accomplishments
National Wrestling Alliance
NWA Rocky Mountain Heavyweight Championship (1 time: 10 March 1948).
New York's Wrestling Hall of Fame
 Class of 1974.

Movies
There are a number of mistaken claims that Tenario appeared in two movies, as himself in the documentary Bone Crushers (1933), and as "Chief Pontiac" in the feature film We're in the Money (1935). In both cases, the man in the movies was the marathon swimmer, lifeguard, and professional wrestler Myron Cox (1901-1975).

Death
He died at Seattle, Washington on 13 November 1984, and his remains were cremated.

Gallery

Footnotes

References

 Little Wolf Seen as a Mat Thriller, The (Washington) Evening Star, (Wednesday, 24 April 1935), p.A16.
 Lardner, John" From the Press Box: Little  Wolf Won't Divulge "Death Trap" Secret Until He Gets Jim Londos' Title", The (Washington) Evening Star, (Wednesday, 24 April 1935), p.A16.
 The Wolf at Londos' Door (Photograph), The (Washington) Evening Star, (Wednesday, 24 April 1935), p.A16.
 I.A.W.: International Associated Wrestlers’ Home Training System, The Tell-U-Vision Entertainer: The Wrestling Chart Published to Create a Mind Picture and Increase your Appreciation of the (2KY) Radio Broadcasts , I.A.W. Home Training System, (Darlinghurst), 1937.
 Chief Little Wolf (as told to William Kadison), "How The Son Of A Poor Ranchman Won His Title: Tribal Gathering Shaped His Destiny", The Sporting Globe, (Saturday, 27 May 1939), p.7.
 La Conga: New Dance Craze Hits Australia, Pix, Vol.8, No.8, (Saturday, 23 August 1941),  pp.42-43.
Ray Olson's 18 Photographs, taken on 1 August 1941, for the Pix article, collection of the State Library of New South Wales.
 Women Prefer Wrestlers, Pix, Vol.35, No.1. (Saturday 11 September 1954), pp.27-31. 
 Wolf Wants Boys' Choir, The (Brisbane) Truth, (Sunday, 10 October 1948), p.13.
 Sullivan, Jane, "For Chief Little Wolf, the last trip home, The Age, (Thursday, 31 July 1980), p.1.
 Juia, "Wrestling Can Be Quite Gentle Fun: Big Chief Little Wolf Never Bites — A Lady", Wireless Weekly, Vol.14, No.18, (Wednesday, 12 July), p.7. 
 York, Barry, "Big Chief Little Wolf: Wrestling, Radio and Folklore in Australia", Journal of Australian Studies, Vol.22, No.58, (January 1998), pp.29-37. 
 York, Barry, "Tenario, Ventura (Chief Little Wolf) (1911–1984)", Australian Dictionary of Biography, Volume 18, Melbourne University Press, (Carlton), 2012.
 "Taste Test No.10", The (Washington) Evening Star, (Friday, 5 June 1936), p.D-2: Advertisement for "White Owl Cigars", featuring action photographs taken on 4 May 1936, in New York, of the match between Chief Little Wolf and Gus Sonnenberg, and the match between Yvon Robert and Ernie Dusek.

External links
 

1911 births
1984 deaths
American male professional wrestlers
Native American professional wrestlers
Australian male professional wrestlers
Professional wrestlers from Colorado
People from Las Animas County, Colorado
United States Army soldiers
United States Army personnel of World War II